The Girls is an American situation comedy television series that was broadcast on CBS from January 1, 1950, until March 25, 1950.

The Girls was based on the book Our Hearts Were Young and Gay by Cornelia Otis Skinner and Emily Kimbrough. In the series, Skinner and Kimbrough, having recently graduated from college and having had a European vacation, share a Greenwich Village apartment in the Roaring Twenties while they pursue careers as actress and writer, respectively. Episodes depict "their struggles, mishaps, and disappointments". The series's original title, Young and Gay, was changed after two episodes. 

Bethel Leslie originally portrayed Skinner. When she left to be in a play, Gloria Stroock replaced her in that role. Mary Malone played Kimbrough, and Kenneth Forbes played Todhunter Smith II.

The Girls was broadcast live at 7 p.m. Eastern Time on Sunday nights, replacing Tonight on Broadway. It lasted for 13 episodes. The producer was Carol Irwin, and the directors were David Rich and Frank Schaffner. It originated at WCBS. Irwin had a disagreement with Skinner and Kimbrough that almost caused the show's cancellation in early February 1950, but they resolved the problem.

References 

1950 American television series debuts
1950 American television series endings
1950s American television series
American live television series
CBS original programming